Hanover Building is a Grade II office building in the NOMA district of Manchester, United Kingdom.

Architecture
Hanover was built between 1905 and was officially open in 1907. The building was listed as a Grade II building in 1988. Hanover is forged from two original buildings, E Block, a Co-operative Wholesale Society drapery warehouse constructed in 1904 and Hanover, added in 1909 to create  of office and additional warehouse space. It was designed by Co-operative Wholesale Society architect F. E. L. Harris and was built using the newest construction techniques of its time. Over 1.5 million bricks were used during construction and the overall construction cost was £50,000.

Hanover is a good example of Edwardian Baroque architecture, constructed in red brick with polished granite and sandstone dressings. Local materials were used wherever possible, including Baxenden bricks, stone from Darley Dale in Derbyshire and granite from Aberdeen. The façade has pilasters and Corinthian order columns and the roof is concealed by parapet walls.

Originally, there was another floor which housed the Mitchell Memorial Hall – it was destroyed in the Manchester Blitz of 1940-41 and was never rebuilt. There are a series of medallions around the building which name all the places Cooperative Wholesale Society traded at the time of construction. During construction, a stonemason mis-spelt 'Sydney' as 'Sidney' – the correction can still be seen today.

NOMA
The Co-operative Group colleagues migrated to One Angel Square in 2013 and Hanover now belongs to the NOMA regeneration scheme. As part of the plans, Hanover Building will be the first listed building to be renovated. The renovation will provide 91,000 sq ft of Grade A office space and retail space facing out onto Corporation Street, Manchester.  The renovation was completed in September 2018.

2015 fire
On 12 October 2015, there was a fire on the E Block side of the building, destroying the top floor and roof area. Strip out works were already underway, and the fire delayed the refurbishment program by around 2 years.

See also

Listed buildings in Manchester-M4

References

Office buildings in Manchester
Office buildings completed in 1909
Grade II listed buildings in Manchester
Grade II listed office buildings
Baroque Revival architecture
Edwardian architecture